Keith Gordon Eldridge Walker (30 November 1922 – 7 November 1989) was an English first-class cricketer.

A banker by profession, Walker played two first-class cricket matches for D. R. Jardine's XI. Both appearances came against Oxford University at Eastbourne, the first coming in 1955 and the second 1957. He score 54 runs in his two matches, with a high score of 26, while with his leg break bowling he bowled 17 wicketless overs which conceded 82 runs. He died at Goring-on-Thames in November 1989.

References

External links

1922 births
1989 deaths
People from Wimbledon, London
English cricketers
D. R. Jardine's XI cricketers
English bankers
20th-century English businesspeople